The 1961/62 NTFL season was the 41st season of the Northern Territory Football League (NTFL).

St Marys have won there 5th premiership title while defeating the Buffaloes in the grand final by 16 points.

Grand Final

References 

Northern Territory Football League seasons
NTFL